A Nightingale Falling is a 2014 Irish film set during the Irish War of Independence based on the 2012 novel by PJ Curtis. Directed by Garret Daly and Martina McGlynn, and written by Daly, the film stars Tara Breathnach, Muireann Bird and Gerard McCarthy. The story concerns two sisters who care for a wounded soldier. The film was released in Irish cinemas in September 2014, and received its Irish television premiere on UTV Ireland on Easter Sunday, 5 April 2015.

Cast
 Tara Breathnach as May Collingwood
 Muireann Bird as Tilly Collingwood
 Gerard McCarthy as Captain Shearing
 Brian Fortune as Tom Nolan
 Elliot Moriarty as Jackie Nolan
 Andy Kellegher as Black & Tan

References

External links

2014 films
Irish drama films
Irish War of Independence films
2010s English-language films